Raff is a surname of German, English or Old Norse origin.

Notable people
Notable people with this surname include:
 Alexander Raff (1820–1914), Australian politician
 Charles Raff (1878-1948), Australian footballer
 Edson Raff (1907-2003), American army officer
 George Raff (1815-1889), Scottish merchant
 Gerhard Raff (born 1946), German historian
 Gideon Raff (born 1972), Israeli director
 Hans Raff (1910-1990), German runner
 Joachim Raff (1822-1882), Swiss composer
 Martin Raff (born 1938), Canadian biologist
Pam Raff (1952-2009), British American dancer
 Rudolf Raff (1942-2019), American biologist

See also
 Riff Raff